Dirk Fischer (born 29 November 1943) is a German politician. He is a member of the Christian Democratic Union (CDU) party. Between 1980 and 2017, he was an MP of the German Bundestag as the representative for Hamburg-Nord constituency. For many years, Fischer was transport policy spokesman of the CDU/CSU parliamentary faction. He is also president of Hamburg Football Association (HFV) and a board member of German Football Association (DFB).

Early life and education 
Fischer was born in Bevensen. After high school, Fischer served as a Bundeswehr soldier from 1964 to 1966. Afterwards he studied law at the University of Hamburg. After graduation in 1978 he worked at Hamburg company Möller + Förster until 1986. Since 1982, he is also licensed as a lawyer.

Political career 
Fischer was a member of Hamburgische Bürgerschaft, the parliament of Hamburg, from 1971 to 5 February 1981.

From 1980, Fischer was a member of the German Bundestag. From 1989 to 2014 he was also transport policy spokesman of the CDU/CSU parliamentary group. From 1992 to 2007 he was chairman of CDU Hamburg. From 1994 to 2014 Fischer was chairman of the Hamburg state group in the Bundestag.

In the 18th legislation period, Fischer was a member of the Committee on Transport and Digital Infrastructure.

In October 2016, Fischer announced that he would not stand in the 2017 federal elections but instead resign from active politics by the end of the parliamentary term.

Other activities 
Since November 2007, Fischer has been serving as president of Hamburg Football Association (HFV) and a board member of German Football Association (DFB).
He is also a member of the Board of Trustees of the Federal Chancellor Helmut Schmidt Foundation.

Recognition 
In September 1994, Fischer received the German Order of Merit First Class.

See also 
Hamburg Parliament
Erck Rickmers
Johannes Versmann

References

External links 
 Website of Dirk Fischer
 Dirk Fischer at the German Bundestag

1943 births
Living people
Members of the Bundestag for Hamburg
Members of the Hamburg Parliament
German football chairmen and investors
University of Hamburg alumni
Officers Crosses of the Order of Merit of the Federal Republic of Germany
Members of the Bundestag 2013–2017
Members of the Bundestag 2009–2013
Members of the Bundestag 2005–2009
Members of the Bundestag 2002–2005
Members of the Bundestag 1998–2002
Members of the Bundestag 1994–1998
Members of the Bundestag for the Christian Democratic Union of Germany